Adam Ashley-Cooper (born 27 March 1984) is a former Australian rugby union player who last played for the LA Giltinis of Major League Rugby (MLR). He has won 121 caps for Australia, the third most of any Australia player at the time of his retirement. His nickname is "Mr. Versatile". He is currently the senior assistant coach for backs with the LA Giltinis.

Early years
Ashley-Cooper is a descendant of the Earls of Shaftesbury. He took up rugby as a 15-year-old while living on the Central Coast in NSW. He was educated at the Berkeley Vale Community High School, the same school that produced Scotland and British and Irish Lions rugby union player Nathan Hines, and NRL prop and Wests Tigers assistant coach Paul Stringer. He played junior rugby for the Ourimbah Razorbacks on  the NSW Central Coast, the same club as Hines. In his teenage years he played both 10 and 12 (fly-half and inside-centre) and says: "I was pretty much all over the shop [even] in those days."

Rugby career

Super Rugby
Ashley-Cooper joined the Brumbies in 2004 on an ARU development contract. He played all of the Brumbies pre-season trials, and accompanied the team to South Africa. As a 20-year-old Ashley-Cooper spent most of his first year at the Brumbies flying around the globe playing for the Australian sevens. For the 2004 Super Rugby final between the Brumbies and Crusaders, Ashley-Cooper sat on the bench at Canberra Stadium as the Brumbies 23rd man, his boots at hand but never unpacked.

In 2005, Ashley-Cooper made his Super Rugby debut on the wing for the Brumbies at home against the Crusaders. He subsequently played two more games that season, against the Chiefs and the Queensland Reds. He was selected for the Wallabies in their second Tri Nations match against the Springboks and made his debut in Perth.

In the 2006 Super Rugby season, Ashley-Cooper played 12 matches for the Brumbies, and scored two tries.

France

Bordeaux
In December 2014, French Top 14 side  announced that Ashley-Cooper would join them on a two-year contract after the 2015 Rugby World Cup.

Japan

Kobelco Steelers

United States

Los Angeles
Having originally signed to play for the Austin Gilgronis prior to the cancellation of the 2020 Major League Rugby season, Ashley-Cooper later signed with LA Giltinis for the 2021 season.

In August 2021, Ashley-Cooper announced his retirement from rugby union.

International career 
Ashley-Cooper played in all but four of the 56 Tests played by Australia between 2008 and 2011, and missed just one of 42 through 2009 and 2011. His five tries at the 2011 Rugby World Cup saw him finish in the tournament's top five try-scorers.

In Ewen McKenzie's second year in charge as Wallabies coach, McKenzie named Ashley-Cooper as Wallabies vice-captain for the 2014 three-test June series against France.

Ashley-Cooper was selected for the Wallabies' 31-man squad for the 2015 Rugby World Cup and played the full 80 minutes of every knockout match on the right wing. He was named Man of the Match in the semi-final against Argentina on 25 October, scoring the second hat-trick of his career in the 29-15 win. This brought Ashley-Cooper's career try tally to 37 and his World Cup tally to 11.

Ashley-Cooper's last match for Australia was a 29-9 loss to New Zealand on 27 August 2016 during that year's Rugby Championship. Ashley-Cooper was subbed off in the 16th minute for a concussion test and didn't return to the field, being replaced by debutant Reece Hodge.

In November 2018, Ashley-Cooper was again selected by Australia for their game against Italy, after a break of more than two years.

Player profile

Versatility

Ashley-Cooper has been nicknamed "Mr Versatile", and sometimes Australia's "Mister Fix It", as is a utility player who can play centre, wing, or fullback. Fairfax journalist Greg Growden suggested that if Ashley-Cooper was asked: "What position do you expect to play this week?" he would answer: "I wouldn't have a clue." According to Growden, Wallabies ex-coach Robbie Deans thinks Ashley-Cooper's versatility is part of what makes him invaluable.

Against Italy, Ireland, USA, Russia, South Africa, New Zealand, and Wales at the 2011 Rugby World Cup Ashley-Cooper played outside centre, on both wings, and at fullback. Similarly, at the 2007 Rugby World Cup he covered the centres against Canada and Fiji, and right wing against Japan, and England. On occasion he played for the Waratahs at inside centre.

Honours

Waratahs
 Super Rugby Champion: 2014
 Australian Conference Winner (2):2014, 2015
 Super Rugby Centurion

LA Giltinis
 Major League Rugby Champion: 2021

Australia
 Rugby World Cup runners up: 2015
Rugby World Cup bronze medallists: 2011
 Tri Nations/The Rugby Championship champion: 2011, 2015

References

External links
 Wallabies Profile
 Waratahs Profile
 

1984 births
Ashley-Cooper family
Australian rugby union players
Australia international rugby union players
ACT Brumbies players
New South Wales Waratahs players
Rugby union centres
Rugby union fullbacks
Rugby union wings
Sportsmen from New South Wales
Australian people of English descent
Living people
Rugby union players from Sydney
Union Bordeaux Bègles players
Australian expatriate rugby union players
Australian expatriate sportspeople in France
Expatriate rugby union players in France
LA Giltinis players
New South Wales Country Eagles players
Kobelco Kobe Steelers players
Austin Gilgronis players
Australian expatriate sportspeople in the United States
Expatriate rugby union players in the United States